A helping hand, also known as a third hand, soldering hand, or X-tra Hands, is a type of extremely adjustable jig used in soldering and craftwork to hold materials near each other so that the user can work on them.

Description
A commonly produced version consists of a weighted base, a pair of twice-adjustable arms ending in crocodile clips, and optionally a magnifying glass, held together by flexible joints.

Purpose
The clips are used to hold a light workpiece in place while the joints allow the user to change the position or angle.  Sometimes helping hands are augmented with modules from the adjustable coolant hose systems used with machine tools.

Tools
Brazing and soldering